is a district located in Shiga Prefecture, Japan.

As of September 1, 2011, the district has an estimated population of 35,629 and a density of 220 persons per km2. The total area is 162.15 km2.

Towns
Hino
Ryūō

Merger
On January 1, 2006 the town of Gamō merged into the city of Higashiōmi.
On March 21, 2010 the town of Azuchi merged into the city of Ōmihachiman.

Transition

Light blue autonomies are Gamō District's towns, deep blue autonomies are Gamō District's villages, and gray autonomies are others.

Districts in Shiga Prefecture